"I'm Beamin'" is a song written by rapper Lupe Fiasco. The Neptunes-produced track was released in January 2010. The song is included on the bonus track version of Lupe Fiasco's  third studio album Lasers, which was released on March 8, 2011.

Music video
The video was released on April 26, 2010 on Lupe's YouTube channel.

Remix
A remix of the song was released on October 13, 2010 entitled "We Beamin'" featuring members of the supergroup All City Chess Club (excluding J. Cole, Wale), and Pharrell. The song is 8 minutes long with every members having verses. The song was included on All City Chess Club member B.o.B's 2010 mixtape No Genre.

References

2010 songs
Lupe Fiasco songs
Atlantic Records singles
Songs written by Lupe Fiasco
Songs written by Pharrell Williams
Song recordings produced by the Neptunes
2010 singles
Songs written by Chad Hugo